Dorymenia quincarinata is a species of mollusc of solenogastres in the family Proneomeniidae. 

Solenogastres may or may not be the sister group of  chitons.

Distribution 
New Zealand

References

 Ponder, W. 1970. A new aplacophoran from New Zealand. J. Malac. Soc. Austr., 2(1):47-54
 García-Álvarez O. & Salvini-Plawen L.v. (2007). Species and diagnosis of the families and genera of Solenogastres (Mollusca). Iberus 25(2): 73-143.
 Spencer, H.G., Marshall, B.A. & Willan, R.C. (2009). Checklist of New Zealand living Mollusca. Pp 196-219. in: Gordon, D.P. (ed.) New Zealand inventory of biodiversity. Volume one. Kingdom Animalia: Radiata, Lophotrochozoa, Deuterostomia. Canterbury University Press, Christchurch.

External links
 Salvini-Plawen, L. (2004). Contributions to the morphological diversity and classification of the order Cavibelonia (Mollusca: Solenogastres. Journal of Molluscan Studies. 70: 73-93

Solenogastres
Molluscs described in 1970